Tullibardine distillery is a Scottish distillery since 1949, producing a single malt whisky. The whisky distillery is located in Blackford, Perth and Kinross, close to the Ochil Hills and the Danny Burn, their main water sources.

The distillery was mothballed in 1995 by then owner Whyte & Mackay. In 2003, it was sold to Tullibardine Distillery Ltd, who resumed production. In 2011, the distillery was sold to the French firm Picard Vins & Spiritueux. This firm in 2013 created an entity for the spirits named Terroirs Distillers.

The distillery produces several types of single malt whisky, including "Aged Oak Edition Single Malt Whisky" and "Sherry Finish Malt Whisky", and related liqueurs.

Tullibardine Distillery runs a visitor's centre.

See also
 Whisky
 Scotch whisky
 List of whisky brands

References

External links 

 Official Webpage

Distilleries in Scotland
1949 establishments in Scotland
Scottish malt whisky
Food and drink companies established in 1949